Zairian Socialist Party was a Zairian political party, based in exile. The general secretary of the party was Betou Aime.

References

Defunct political parties in the Democratic Republic of the Congo
Socialist parties in Africa